Hubert Busby Junior (born 18 June 1970) is a Canadian-born Jamaican football manager and former player.

Playing career
In 1993, Busby Jr. played in the Canadian National Soccer League with Windsor Wheels. As a player, Busby Jr. spent time with the Toronto Lynx, Montreal Impact, Vancouver Whitecaps, Oxford United, Crystal Palace, Caldas Sport Clube, and Ottawa Wizards. In 1996, he played in the Canadian National Soccer League with Oakville Canadian Western.

Busby Jr. played for the Jamaica national football team from 2001 to 2003.

Management career
After retiring from soccer, Busby Jr. earned a degree in sociology from Queen's University, and earned his USSF "A" license and NSCAA "A" diploma with over 10 years of diversified coaching experience including the women's programs at Fairleigh Dickinson University and Queen's University.

His first professional coaching experience was in 2003 with the Ottawa Wizards, where he led he Wizards to a conference title and clinched a playoff spot. During the playoffs the Ottawa Wizards Board handed a two days notice to the Canadian Soccer League in withdrawing from the playoffs. As a result, from that the CSL revoked the franchise.

In 2004, he was named Canadian Youth Team Coach for the National Training Centre in Eastern Canada and Technical Director for the Kanata Soccer Club. As well he served as the head coach for the Ottawa St. Anthony Italia he won the Ontario Cup and help the team finish runners up to the Windsor Border Stars in the Open Canada Cup.

In 2005, he was named the new Head Coach for the Toronto Lynx, where he had a disappointing season finishing with a league worst three wins, 17 losses, and eight ties the worst performance in league history and 12th place in the 12 team league. After one season with the Lynx he left the head coach role.

After leaving the Lynx in 2006 he coached the AFC Leopards of the VMSL Premier B Division, and led them to the Imperial Cup but lost in the quarter-finals to Westside FC. He left the Leopards to become the Whitecaps FC Academy's NSPPP Technical Coordinator. On 16 December 2009 was named as the successor of Bob Birarda as Vancouver Whitecaps Women head coach and left the Whitecaps FC Academy.

In 2013, Busby signed on as Head Coach and general manager for the Seattle Sounders Women.

In 2019, Busby served as an assistant coach with the Jamaica women's national team during qualification and for the 2019 FIFA Women's World Cup in France.

In 2020, he was named Head Coach for the Jamaica Women's national team for Olympic qualifying.

In 2021, The Guardian reported that he was accused by a former player of attempting to solicit sex from her during a recruiting process when he was in charge of the Vancouver Whitecaps women’s team.

References

External links
Profile of Hubert Busby Jr.
Lynx Sign Home Grown Talent As Head Coach

1970 births
Association football goalkeepers
Black Canadian soccer players
Caldas S.C. players
Canadian expatriate sportspeople in the United States
Canadian expatriate soccer players
Canadian expatriate sportspeople in Portugal
Canadian National Soccer League players
Canadian people of Jamaican descent
Canadian Soccer League (1998–present) players
Canadian soccer coaches
Canadian soccer players
Crystal Palace F.C. players
Expatriate footballers in England
Expatriate footballers in Kenya
Expatriate footballers in Portugal
Expatriate soccer players in the United States
Jamaica international footballers
Jamaican expatriate footballers
Jamaican expatriate sportspeople in Kenya
Jamaican expatriate sportspeople in Portugal
Jamaican expatriate sportspeople in England
Jamaican expatriate sportspeople in the United States
Jamaican footballers
Jamaican people of Canadian descent
Living people
Montreal Impact (1992–2011) players
Naturalized citizens of Canada
Ottawa Wizards players
Queen's University at Kingston alumni
Soccer people from Ontario
Sportspeople from Kingston, Ontario
Toronto Lynx coaches
Toronto Lynx players
USL First Division coaches
A-League (1995–2004) players
Vancouver Whitecaps (1986–2010) players
Canadian Soccer League (1998–present) managers
Canadian expatriate sportspeople in England
Jamaica women's national football team managers